Nacoochee can refer to several locations in northeast Georgia:

Sautee Nacoochee, Georgia, in White County, incorporating the Nacoochee Mound and the Nacoochee Valley Historic District  
Nacoochee Mound, a prehistoric mound
Rabun Gap-Nacoochee School, a private, college-preparatory school
Stovall Mill Covered Bridge, also known as Nacoochee Bridge